Vietnam National University of Agriculture (or VNUA), until 2014 Hanoi University of Agriculture (HUA), is an education and research university  specializing in the agricultural sector. The university is located in Trau Quy town, Gia Lam district, a Hanoi suburban area, about 12 km far from Hanoi city centre.

History
Vietnam National University of Agriculture was established in Hanoi on October 12, 1956, first called University of Agriculture and Forestry, based in Van Dien ( Hanoi ). The first Rector was Prof. Bui Huy Dap, the first vice-rector was the agronomist Luong Dinh Cua. In 1959, the school moved to the present location, Trau Quy, Gia Lam, Hanoi.

The university name has changed several times: 
 University of Agriculture and Forestry from 1956, 
 Academy of Agriculture and Forestry in 1958, 
 In 1963 the Academy of Agriculture and Forestry was split into two universities: the University of Agriculture and the University of Forestry. 
 In 1967 the University of Agriculture was renamed Agricultural University, 
 In 2008 its official name became Hanoi University of Agriculture (HUA),
 In 2014 the university was renamed Vietnam National University of Agriculture (VNUA)

1956 - 1966
Formerly the College of Agriculture and Forestry, was established under Decree No. 53/ND-NL dated 12/10/1956 of the Ministry of Agriculture and Forestry, with three departments: Agronomy, Animal Husbandry-Veterinary Medicine, Forestry education; in the five disciplines of farming, agricultural mechanics, animal husbandry, veterinary and forestry.

In 1958, the research institute farming, livestock research institute, and the timber and forestry laboratory merged to become the Institute of Agriculture and Forestry. In 1961, branches were set up for farming and fish processing. In 1963, the academy moved the staff and technical facilities for the establishment of the Institute of Agricultural Sciences, College of Forestry. Now called University School of Agriculture.

In research, the university created three varieties: 813, 828 and VN1; and two sweet potato varieties for high yield.

1967 - 1975
The university has established Agriculture University II, now called Hanoi Agricultural University 1. In 1968, the School of Fisheries Sciences split to form the University of Fisheries.

1975 - 1990
After the liberation of the South, the school built  Agricultural University No IV (now University of Agriculture and Forestry, Ho Chi Minh City ) while sending hundreds of experienced staff, graduate engineer additional staff for the departments of the southern provinces.

In 1977, the university established a Faculty of Land Management.

The school has trained over 9800 engineers, creating four high-yielding rice varieties (T125, A3, A4, A5).

1991 - 2000
The school has trained over 8800 engineers, to select and create 21 new plant varieties.

2001 - 2008
The university has 13 science, 9 departments, 13 institutes and centers, with 941 staff members, including 520 faculty (61 Professors, Associate Professor, Dr. 326, Masters). The university has 29 undergraduate programs, 24 training program graduate.

The size of the university training school continued to increase, from 12,300 students in 2001 to 17,600 in 2005 (up 43%). All courses increased from 469 students in 2001 to 857 students in 2005 (up 82%).

As of 2006 the university has trained over 44,800 engineers, 1072 masters, 267 doctoral and staff colleges, intermediate and technician. Particularly from 2001 to 03/31/2006, trained over 11,900 engineers, 668 masters, 77 PhD.

Where the Party and State was awarded the Medal of Ho Chi Minh in 2001, Hero of Labor, during renovation in 2005.

Personnel
Total number of teachers and school personnel is 860 people, including 549 lecturers, 01 National Awarded Teacher, 27 outstanding teachers, 84 professors and associate professors, 158 doctoral, 152 master's degree lecturers.

Faculties
Faculty of Agronomy
Faculty of Animal Science
Faculty of Accounting and Business Management
Faculty of Biotechnology
Faculty of Economics and Rural Development
Faculty of Engineering
Faculty of Environment
Faculty of Fisheries
Faculty of Education and Foreign Languages
Faculty of Food Science and Technology
Faculty of Information Technology
Faculty of Land Management
Faculty of Political and Social Sciences
Faculty of Veterinary Medicine
School for International Education and Development
Citizen Military Education

Institutes and centers
Institute for Graduate Education
Center for Agricultural Research and Ecological Studies
Center for Experimentation and Vocational Training
Information and Library Center
Center for Interdisciplinary Research on Rural Development
The Research Center for Tropical Plant Pathology
Training Center for Advanced Technology
Center for Sports and Culture
Foreign Language Center
Center for Sustainable Agriculture Research and Development
Center for Professional and Job Consultations
Center for Infrastructure and Campus Services
Institute of Agro-Biology
Rice Research Institute
Center for Agricultural Consultations and Services
Center for Printing and Publications
Clinic and Kidergarden

Research

Faculty of Accounting and Business Management
Accounting ;
Business Administration ;
Agribusiness ;
Agriculture Business Administration advanced .

Faculty of Agronomy
Department of Agronomy is one of three faculties that were first established at the Hanoi University of Agriculture. Faculty of Agronomy, Crop Science, previously known as, was established in 1956. Sciences in 1997 to officially rename the current Agronomy. Currently, the department has 95 staff, including Professor 6.
Undergraduate programmes, Bachelor's degree:
Crops;
Seed selection and plant breeding;
Plant Protection ;
Horticultural science;
Mulberry and raising honey bees ;
Fruits and vegetables and landscape.
Graduate programmes, Master's degree:
Cultivation techniques;
Seed selection and breeding plants ;
Protect plants .

Faculty of Animal Science
Undergraduate programs
Animal science
Animal nutrition and feed technology
Animal production and health
Aquaculture
Aquatic animal pathology
Master programs
Animal science
Aquaculture
Doctoral programs
Animal science
Animal genetics and breeding
Animal nutrition

Faculty of Environment
Undergraduate programs
Environmental engineering;
Environmental management;
Ecology and natural resources management.
Master program 
Environmental sciences.

Faculty of Land Management
Undergraduate programs
Soil science
Agro-chemistry
Land management
Master programs
Soil science
Land management
Doctoral programs
Soil science
Land management

Faculty of Veterinary Medicine
Undergraduate programmes, Bachelor's degree
Veterinarian
Graduate programmes, Doctor/PhD degree

Faculty of Economics and Rural Development
Economics
Economy Agriculture
Extension

Faculty of Engineering
Undergraduate programmes, Bachelor's degree:
Agricultural Engineering
Mechanical force
mechanical engineering
Preservation and processing Mechanical
supply and use
Automation
Rural Works (Works)
Rural industries (public areas)
Graduate programmes, Master's degree
Technical plant and equipment mechanization Agro-forestry
Automobile Engineering tractors
Electrification of agriculture and rural
Graduate programmes, Doctor/PhD degree:

Machines and technical equipment of agricultural mechanization and rural

Faculty of Biotechnology
Faculty of Biotechnology was established October 23, 2008
Biotechnology Engineering

Faculty of Information Technology
The Faculty was established on October 10, 2005. The first intake class was TH47 in 2002. This class of TH47 graduated on May 6, 2007.  
There are 5 Departments and 1 Center in the Faculty:
Department of Software Engineering;
Department of Computer Science;
Department of Mathematics;
Department of Physics;
Department of Applied Mathematics - Informatics;
Center for Computational and Data Integration
The Faculty has so far only one undergraduate programmes with two study fields:
Computer engineering
Information management

Faculty of Education and Foreign Languages
Landscapes in Hanoi Agricultural University
Teachers of Agricultural Engineering

Faculty of Faculty of Political and Social Science
BA Sociology (Major Rural Sociology)

Awards and honors
Independence Medal runner (1991);
Third-class Independence Medal (1986);
Labour Order, first class (1981);
3 second-class Labor Medal (1977, 1965, 1962);
2 third-class Labor Medal (1973, 1960);
Medal of Freedom of the Lao PDR (1981).
Hero of Labor (2005);
Ho Chi Minh Medal (2001);
First-class Independence Medal (1996);
Labour Order, first class of the Lao PDR  (2000);
Ministry of Education and Training awards and gave excellent advanced chess school (school year 1999 to 2000, 2002–2003); 02 training Merit (1997, 1998), 06 Certificate of Merit for Scientific Research (from 2001 to 2005 );
20 Certificate of Merit from Ministry of Agriculture - Rural Development, Ministry of Science and Technology, the provincial People's Committee on the achievement of science and technology training and technology transfer for production;
30 consecutive years been recognized outstanding units advanced on the capital's sports (1975–2005).

International cooperation in education
Advanced education program in crop science
Advanced education program in business administration in agriculture.
Program 2 + 2 joint training between Vietnam National University of Agriculture and the University of Life Sciences Van Hall Larenstein (VHL). The majors were selected by students: Plant Science, Vegetable Fruit landscape, agricultural business management.
Joint training program international master's degree in Economics and Rural Sociology.
Affiliate Program Masters Graduate sustainable farming.
Joint training program between Vietnam National University of Agriculture with Changjiang University.
Summer school short courses for international students

See also
List of universities in Vietnam

References

External links
Official website
International Relations

Universities in Hanoi
Technical universities and colleges in Vietnam
Engineering universities and colleges in Vietnam
Educational institutions established in 1956
1956 establishments in Vietnam